Sari Bagh (also Romanized as Sārī Bāgh; also known as Sārī Bākh) is a village in Karaftu Rural District, in the Central District of Takab County, West Azerbaijan Province, Iran. At the 2006 census, its population was 150, in 30 families.

References 

Populated places in Takab County